The purpose of this template is to collect source text used in several articles in one place, in order to minimize maintenance and storage space. The template is typically used in the articles: List of 2017 UCI Women's Teams and riders and 2017 in women's road cycling and in the current year also on the UCI Women's Teams page.
List updated 16 November 2017

The 2017 UCI Women's Teams are:

Defunct teams
The below lists all teams which folded completely at the end of the 2016 season, or dropped down from UCI level to National level.

References

2017